Richard Dacoury (born July 6, 1959, in Abidjan, Ivory Coast) is a former French professional basketball player. He retired in 1998, as the basketball player who won the most French League titles during his career, with 9. Dacoury is considered to be one the greatest players in French basketball history. He had his jersey number 7 retired by Limoges, in October 2010.

Professional career
Dacoury led the French team of Limoges to several titles, including the 1993 FIBA European League (EuroLeague), which is widely regarded as one of the greatest upsets in European-wide club basketball history. He was a three-time member of the FIBA European Selection team, in 1987, and twice in 1991.

National team career
Dacoury played with the French national team (1981–1992). With France, he played in a total of 160 games, and scored a total of 2,230 points. He played in 5 EuroBaskets, one FIBA World Cup, and one Summer Olympics.

He played at the following tournaments: the 1981 EuroBasket (Prague, Czechoslovakia), the 1983 EuroBasket (Nantes, France),
the 1984 Summer Olympic Games (Los Angeles, United States), the 1986 FIBA World Championship (Zaragoza, Spain), the 1987 EuroBasket (Athens, Greece), the 1989 EuroBasket (Zagreb, Yugoslavia), and the 1991 EuroBasket (Rome, Italy).

Awards and accomplishments

Club honours
1982 French Cup Winner (Limoges)
1982 FIBA Korać Cup Champion (Limoges)
1983 French League Champion (Limoges)
1983 French Cup Winner (Limoges)
1983 FIBA Korać Cup Champion (Limoges)
1984 French League Champion (Limoges)
1985 French League Champion (Limoges)
1985 French Cup Winner (Limoges)
1988 French League Champion (Limoges)
1988 French Cup Winner (Limoges)
1988 FIBA European Cup Winners' Cup Champion (Limoges)
1989 French League Champion (Limoges)
1990 French League Champion (Limoges)
1990 French Cup Winner (Limoges)
1993 FIBA European League (EuroLeague) (Limoges)
1993 French League Champion (Limoges)
1993 French Cup Winner (Limoges)
1994 French League Champion (Limoges)
1994 French Cup Winner (Limoges)
1997 French League Champion (PSG Racing)

References

External links
FIBA Profile
FIBA Europe Profile

1959 births
Living people
Basketball players at the 1984 Summer Olympics
Basket CRO Lyon players
French men's basketball players
Ivorian emigrants to France
Limoges CSP players
Olympic basketball players of France
Paris Racing Basket players
Shooting guards
Small forwards
Sportspeople from Abidjan
1986 FIBA World Championship players